The 1986 FIFA World Cup UEFA–OFC qualification play-off was a two-legged home-and-away tie between the winners of the Oceania qualifying tournament, Australia, and the second-placed team from the UEFA Group 7, Scotland. The games were played on 20 November and 4 December 1985 in Glasgow and Melbourne respectively. Australia were hoping to play in the FIFA World Cup for the first time since 1974 and Scotland were hoping for a fourth successive FIFA World Cup.

Background 
Scotland had qualified for the play-off by finishing second in their UEFA group, behind Spain. Scotland secured second place in dramatic circumstances with a 1–1 draw against Wales at Ninian Park, Cardiff. Davie Cooper scored a late equalising goal with a penalty kick to give Scotland the point they needed, but manager Jock Stein collapsed and died of a heart attack. This meant that assistant manager Alex Ferguson took charge of the team for the play-off.

Australia finished top of a single four-team group that comprised New Zealand, as well as Israel and Chinese Taipei, both of whom were at the time members of FIFA but were outside their own regional confederations.

Play-off match
In the first leg of the play-off in Hampden Park on 20 November 1985, Scotland took the lead in the 53rd minute from a twenty-yard free kick scored by Davie Cooper, hitting the ball around the wall and into the bottom right hand corner of the net. The second goal arrived in the 59th minute from Frank McAvennie who was making his senior debut for Scotland. He lobbed the ball over the goalkeeper after being set up by a header from Kenny Dalglish. The second leg on 4 December finished goalless which was enough for Scotland to advance to the 1986 FIFA World Cup finals in Mexico.

First leg

Second leg

Aftermath
Scotland qualified for the 1986 FIFA World Cup Finals in Mexico and were drawn into Group E with West Germany, Uruguay and debutants Denmark. Scotland lost 1–0 to Denmark and 2–1 to West Germany. Scotland had to beat Uruguay and Uruguay played with ten men and drew 0–0. Scotland finished bottom in the group on one point.

References

FIFA World Cup qualification (UEFA–OFC play-off)
Play-off UEFA-OFC
Play-off
World Cup 1986
World Cup 1986
Play-off
FIFA World Cup qualification (UEFA–OFC play-off)
FIFA World Cup qualification inter-confederation play-offs
FIFA World Cup qualification (UEFA–OFC play-off)
FIFA World Cup qualification (UEFA–OFC play-off)
FIFA World Cup qualification (UEFA–OFC play-off)
International association football competitions hosted by Australia
International association football competitions hosted by Scotland
International sports competitions in Glasgow
Sports competitions in Melbourne
FIFA World Cup qualification (UEFA–OFC play-off)